Mihanović’s fragment of the Acts of the Apostles is one of the oldest preserved Glagolitic manuscripts written in Old Church Slavonic.

In it, features of the Serbian vernacular appear, under whose influence later would develop Serbian recension of Church Slavonic. It is considered, on the basis of some language features (e.g. replacement of the letter  f  with the letter  p , i.e. Stepan instead of Stefan) and the Glagolitic alphabet itself, that it originated at the end of 11th century or early 12th century in Bosnia or Zeta or Zahumlje.

The manuscript itself consists of two sheets of parchment, 24 cm × 18.5 cm in size, on which is inscribed the part of Acts of the Apostles, according to the Eastern Orthodox rite and is related, in place and time of origin, to the so-called Gršković's fragment of the Acts of the Apostles.

Manuscript was found glued on the cover of a 1262 Serbian transcript of Ilovička krmčija, Zakonopravilo, in the collection of Cyrillic manuscripts of Antun Mihanović, and is considered the oldest preserved transcript, collection of civil and ecclesiastical regulations of the Byzantine Empire, which was translated by Saint Sava at the beginning of the 13th century.

Today, the artifact is kept in the library of Croatian Academy of Sciences and Arts in Zagreb.

See also
List of Glagolitic manuscripts
Medieval Serbian literature
Serbian manuscripts

References

Sources 
 

Old Church Slavonic language
Medieval Serbian texts
Serbian manuscripts
Serbian literature